Witney Capri Carson McAllister (née Carson; born October 17, 1993) is an American professional Latin ballroom dancer and choreographer. She first gained attention in 2012, when the 18-year-old finished ladies' second runner-up in season nine of So You Think You Can Dance. Carson continued her professional dancing career in early 2013 as a troupe dancer in seasons 16 and 17 of Dancing with the Stars. She was promoted to professional partner in season 18. In season 19, she and her partner Alfonso Ribeiro were announced the winners on November 25, 2014, making her one of six professional dancers to win the mirror ball trophy within their first two seasons, while Ribeiro waited ten years for him to win. For that season, she received a nomination for the Primetime Emmy Award for Outstanding Choreography. In 2019, she reunited with Ribeiro to co-host the reboot of Catch 21.
Throughout her dance career, Carson has worked with dancers and choreographers such as Mia Michaels, Nappytabs, Travis Wall, Sonya Tayeh, Tyce Diorio, Mark Ballas, Derek Hough, and Stacey Tookey.

Early life 
Carson was born in American Fork, Utah. She is the oldest of four children. She has two brothers and a sister. She started her career as a dancer at the age of three, training in different dance styles including ballet, jazz, hip hop, ballroom and tap, among others.

Career

2012 to 2014: Competitive dancing and breakthrough 
At age of 18, Carson auditioned for season nine of the Fox Broadcasting show So You Think You Can Dance. She made it through to the top 20 finalists. Her partner was ballet dancer and season-winner Chehon Wespi-Tschopp. As she advanced to the top six dancers, Carson partnered with Nick Lazzarini, Stephen "Twitch" Boss and Marko Germar before she was eliminated after the week-seven round in September 2012.

She returned in season ten, partnering with Paul Karmiryan and season-winner Du-shaunt "Fik-shun" Stegall.

Carson was announced as a troupe dancer on the reality-television series Dancing with the Stars in March 2013. Carson, partnered with Dancing with the Stars professional dancer Lindsay Arnold, was a contestant on So You Think You Can Dance season nine. She continued dancing and choreographing for the troupe on season 17.

On season 18, Carson was promoted to professional dancer, partnering with singer Cody Simpson. They were eliminated on April 14, 2014, finishing in ninth place. The following season, Carson returned as a professional dancer, partnering with actor Alfonso Ribeiro and winning the competition on November 25, 2014.

2015 to present: Subsequent success 
In 2015, Carson starred in Dancin': It's On!, directed by David Winters and also starring other winners and runner ups of So You Think You Can Dance, as well as Gary Daniels.

Carson returned for season 20 as partner for season 19 Bachelor, Chris Soules. They were the eighth couple to be eliminated, finishing in fifth place.

For season 21, Carson was paired with Big Time Rush singer and actor Carlos PenaVega. They reached the Finals but were eliminated on Night 1 and finished in fourth place.

For season 22, Carson was paired with NFL player Von Miller. During a double elimination on week 7, Miller and Carson were eliminated and finished in 8th place.

For season 23, Carson was paired with rapper Vanilla Ice. During a double elimination on week 4, they were eliminated and finished in 10th place.

For season 24, Carson was partnered with comedian Chris Kattan. They were first eliminated on March 27, 2017.

For season 25, Carson was partnered with Malcolm in the Middle actor Frankie Muniz. They reached the finals and ultimately finished in third place.

For season 26, Carson was paired with Olympic luger Chris Mazdzer. They were eliminated on the third week of competition, tying in fourth place with Jennie Finch Daigle and Mirai Nagasu and their partners Keo Motsepe and Alan Bersten.

For season 27, Carson was partnered with actor Milo Manheim. They reached the finals of the competition and finished in second place behind Bobby Bones and Sharna Burgess.

For season 28, Carson was partnered with Nickelodeon actor and comedian Kel Mitchell. They reached the finals and finished in second place behind Hannah Brown and Alan Bersten.

For season 30, Carson returned to the show and was partnered with WWE wrestler Mike "The Miz" Mizanin. They finished in 9th place after being eliminated week 7.

For season 31, Carson was partnered with comedian, actor & television personality Wayne Brady. They reached the finals and the couple finished in third place.

Carson became the co-host of the game show Catch 21 in November 2019, which reunited her with Ribiero.

Personal life 
Carson married Carson McAllister on January 1, 2016, in a ceremony of the Church of Jesus Christ of Latter-day Saints at the Salt Lake Temple in Salt Lake City. Fellow Dancing with the Stars dancers Brittany Cherry, Jenna Johnson, and Emma Slater were among her bridesmaids, with Lindsay Arnold serving as her matron of honor. On July 23, 2020, the couple announced that they were expecting their first child, a boy. Their son, Kevin Leo McAllister, was born on January 3, 2021. On November 14, 2022, Carson announced they are expecting their second child, a boy, due in May 2023.

Awards and nominations

So You Think You Can Dance Performances and results

Dancing with the Stars performances 
 The scores below have been adjusted to be out of 30, not 40.*

With Cody Simpson 

1 Score given by guest judge Robin Roberts.

2 For this week only, as part of the "Partner Switch-Up" week, Simpson performed with Sharna Burgess instead of Carson. Carson performed with Drew Carey.

3 Score given by guest judge Julianne Hough.

4 Score given by guest judge Donny Osmond.

With Alfonso Ribeiro 

Footnotes:
 Score given by guest judge Kevin Hart in place of Goodman.
 The American public scored the dance in place of Goodman with the averaged score being counted alongside the three other judges.
 This week only, for "Partner Switch-Up" week, Ribeiro performed with Cheryl Burke instead of Carson. Carson performed with Michael Waltrip.
 Score given by guest judge Jessie J in place of Goodman.
 Score given by guest judge Pitbull in place of Goodman.

With Chris Soules

With Carlos PenaVega 
This season returned having three judges.

1 Score given by guest judge Alfonso Ribeiro.

2 This week only, for "Partner Switch-Up" week, PenaVega performed with Lindsay Arnold instead of Carson. Carson performed with Nick Carter.

3 Score given by guest judge Maksim Chmerkovskiy.

4 Score given by guest judge Olivia Newton-John.

With Von Miller 

1 Score given by guest judge Zendaya.2 For this week only, as part of "America's Switch Up", Miller performed with Lindsay Arnold instead of Carson. Carson performed with Wanyá Morris.3 Score given by guest judge Maksim Chmerkovskiy.

With Vanilla Ice

With Chris Kattan

With Frankie Muniz 

1 Score given by guest judge Shania Twain.

2 Score given by guest judge Julianne Hough.

With Chris Mazdzer 

1 Score given by guest judge Rashad Jennings.

2 Score given by guest judge David Ross.

With Milo Manheim

With Kel Mitchell 

1 Score given by guest judge Leah Remini.

2 Score given by guest judge Joey Fatone.

With Mike "The Miz" Mizanin 

1 Derek Hough was absent so score was given out of 30.

With Wayne Brady 

1 Score awarded by guest judge Michael Bublé.

Awards and achievements

References

External links 
 
 

1993 births
American female dancers
Living people
People from American Fork, Utah
So You Think You Can Dance (American TV series) contestants
Latter Day Saints from Utah
Dancing with the Stars (American TV series) winners
21st-century American dancers
21st-century American women